An upset is a victory by an underdog team.  In the context of the NCAA Division I men's basketball tournament, a single-elimination tournament, this generally constitutes a lower seeded team defeating a higher-seeded (i.e., higher-ranked) team; a widely recognized upset is one performed by a team ranked substantially lower than its opponent.

This is the list of victories by teams seeded 10 or lower in the first round and second rounds of the tournament, as well as those by teams seeded 8 or 9 against 1 seeds in the second round, since it expanded to 64 teams in 1985; as these low-seeded teams were automatically paired against higher-seeded teams at the start of the tournament, their opening victories are almost always considered upsets (to date only three teams seeded 10 or lower in the first round won as betting "favorites", and only one such team won in the first round as a pick 'em). Most victories by these teams in later rounds were usually against better seeded opponents as well. The list also includes victories by teams seeded 8 or lower in the Sweet 16 (the four regional semifinals), teams seeded 7 or lower in the Elite Eight (the four regional finals), and teams seeded 6 or lower in the Final Four. All teams are listed by athletic brand names they used at the time of their wins, which do not always match those in use today.

The NCAA defines a tournament "upset" as a victory by a team seeded 5 or more lines below its defeated opponent.

On March 16, 2018, the University of Maryland, Baltimore County (UMBC) Retrievers became the first 16-seed to upset a 1-seed when they defeated the Virginia Cavaliers 74–54 in the first round; this was followed by the Fairleigh Dickinson Knights defeating the Purdue Boilermakers 63–58 on March 17, 2023. 

The year 2020 will not appear in this list as a result of the tournament being cancelled entirely due to the COVID–19 pandemic.

Round of 64
This round was called the First Round until 2011, when the introduction of the First Four caused the round to be renamed the Second Round. Starting with the 2016 tournament, it returned to being called the First Round. There were ten wins by double-digit seeds in 2016, which was the most in tournament history. In 2001, 2012, and 2021, there were nine double-digit seed upsets during First Round play.

Detail between each pair of seeds in this section has been updated as of completion of the 2023 Round of 64, representing 152 games played between each pair.

16 defeats 1
There have been two (2) games where a 16-seed has defeated a 1-seed since 1985:

15 defeats 2
There have been 11 games where a 15-seed has defeated a 2-seed, in the Round of 64, since 1985:

14 defeats 3
There have been 22 games where a 14-seed has defeated a 3-seed, in the Round of 64, since 1985:

13 defeats 4
There have been 32 games where a 13-seed has defeated a 4-seed, in the Round of 64, since 1985:

12 defeats 5
There have been 53 games where a 12-seed has defeated a 5-seed, in the Round of 64, since 1985:

11 defeats 6
There have been 58 games where an 11-seed has defeated a 6-seed, in the Round of 64, since 1985:

10 defeats 7
There have been 59 games where a 10-seed has defeated a 7-seed, in the Round of 64, since 1985:

Round of 32
This round is called the Second Round. Occasionally, it is referred to as the regional quarterfinals.

This shows all Round of 32 upset victories by teams seeded 10 or lower, continuing their upset victories from the Round of 64. This section introduces additional "meeting criteria of team seeded 5 or more lines below its defeated opponent", being all Round of 32 upset victories by teams seeded 8 or 9 against 1 seeds.

16th seed victories
No 16 seed has ever won a second-round game. The only 16 seeds to ever reach the Second Round are the UMBC Retrievers in 2018, who lost to 9 seed Kansas State 50–43, and the Fairleigh Dickinson Knights in 2023, who lost to 9 seed Florida Atlantic 78–70.

15th seed victories
Four of the eleven 15 seeds who advanced from the Round of 64 also achieved an upset victory in the Round of 32. Seeds of the teams they defeated are in parentheses.

14th seed victories
Two of the twenty-two 14 seeds who advanced from the Round of 64 also achieved an upset victory in the Round of 32. Seeds of the teams they defeated are in parentheses.

13th seed victories
Six of the thirty-one 13 seeds who advanced from the Round of 64 also achieved an upset victory in the Round of 32. Seeds of the teams they defeated are in parentheses.

‡ Not officially an upset because the teams were separated by only 1 seed line.

12th seed victories
Twenty-two of the fifty-three 12 seeds who advanced from the Round of 64 also won in the Round of 32. Seeds of the teams they defeated are in parentheses.

Nine of these victories were against lower seeded teams that had also advanced from the Round of 64 due to upsets; thus, these nine victories do not count as upsets, and have been grouped here in a table separate from the thirteen upset wins by 12 seeds in the second round.

11th seed victories
Twenty-six of the fifty-eight 11 seeds who advanced from the Round of 64 also won in the Round of 32. Seeds of the teams they defeated are in parentheses.

Six of these victories were against lower seeded teams that had also advanced from the Round of 64 due to upsets; thus, these six victories do not count as upsets, and have been grouped here in a table separate from the twenty upset wins by 11 seeds in the second round.

10th seed victories
Twenty-four of the fifty-nine 10 seeds who advanced from the Round of 64 also won in the Round of 32. Seeds of the teams they defeated are in parentheses.

Five of these victories were against lower seeded teams that had also advanced from the Round of 64 due to upsets; thus, these six victories do not count as upsets, and have been grouped here in a table separate from the nineteen upset wins by 10 seeds in the second round.

9th seed victories
Eight of the seventy-seven 9 seeds who advanced from the Round of 64 also won in the Round of 32. Seeds of the teams they defeated are in parentheses.

Two of these victories was against a lower seeded team that had also advanced from the Round of 64 due to upset; thus, these second round victories do not count as upsets, and has been shown here in a table separate from the six upset wins by 9 seeds in the second round.

8th seed victories
Sixteen (16) of the seventy-three 8 seeds who advanced from the Round of 64 also achieved an upset victory in the Round of 32. Seeds of the teams they defeated are in parentheses.

Sweet Sixteen
The Sweet Sixteen are the eight pairs of teams that meet in the Regional semifinals.

15 seeds
One of the four 15 seeds who advanced from the Round of 32 also achieved an upset victory in the Sweet Sixteen. Seed of the team they defeated is in parentheses.

14 seeds
Although two 14 seeds made it to the Sweet Sixteen, neither of them won their games in this round. In 1986, Cleveland State lost to 7 seed Navy by only a single point.

13 seeds
Although six 13 seeds made it to the Sweet Sixteen, none of them won their games in this round. The closest margin of defeat happened in 1998, when  Valparaiso lost to 8 seed Rhode Island by 6 points.

12 seeds
Two of the twenty-two 12 seeds who advanced from the Round of 32 also won in the Sweet Sixteen. Seeds of the teams they defeated are in parentheses.

Interestingly, with these two victories, a 12 seed has never lost against an 8 seed.

‡ Not officially an upset because the teams were separated by fewer than 5 seed lines.

11 seeds
Nine of the twenty-six 11 seeds who advanced from the Round of 32 also won in the Sweet Sixteen. Seeds of the teams they defeated are in parentheses, showing that three of these were upset victories (separated by more than 4 seed lines).

‡ Not officially an upset because the teams were separated by fewer than 5 seed lines.

10 seeds
Nine of the twenty-four 10 seeds who advanced from the Round of 32 also won in the Sweet Sixteen. Seeds of the teams they defeated are in parentheses, showing that four of these were upset victories (separated by more than 4 seed lines).

† Not an upset victory, as the 10 seed defeated a lower seed.
‡ Not officially an upset, as the teams were separated by fewer than 5 seed lines.

9 seeds 
Four of the seven 9 seeds who advanced from the Round of 32 also won in the Sweet Sixteen. Seeds of the teams they defeated are in parentheses, showing that one of these was an upset victory (separated by more than 4 seed lines).

† Not an upset victory, as the 9 seed defeated a lower seed.
‡ Not officially an upset, as the teams were separated by fewer than 5 seed lines.

8 seeds 
Nine of the fifteen 8 seeds who advanced from the Round of 32 also achieved upset victories won in the Sweet Sixteen. Seeds of the teams they defeated are in parentheses, showing that none of these was an upset victory (separated by more than 4 seed lines).

Elite Eight
The Elite Eight are the four pairs of teams that meet in the Regional Finals.

15 seeds
The only 15 seed who advanced from the Sweet Sixteen was defeated in the Elite Eight.

12 seeds
Although two 12 seeds have advanced from the Sweet Sixteen, both were defeated in the Elite Eight.

11 seeds
Five of the nine 11 seeds who advanced from the Sweet Sixteen also won in the Elite Eight. Seeds of the teams they defeated are in parentheses, showing that four of these were upset victories (separated by more than 4 seed lines). None of those teams would go on to win in the Final Four.

‡ Not officially an upset, as the teams were separated by fewer than 5 seed lines.

10 seeds
One of the nine 10 seeds who advanced from the Sweet Sixteen also won in the Elite Eight. Seed of the team they defeated is in parentheses, showing that this was an upset victory (separated by more than 4 seed lines). The team did not win in the Final Four.

9 seeds
One of the four 9 seeds who advanced from the Sweet Sixteen also won in the Elite Eight. Seed of the team they defeated is in parentheses, showing that this was an upset victory (separated by more than 4 seed lines). The team did not win in the Final Four.

8 seeds
Six of the nine 8 seeds who advanced from the Sweet Sixteen also won in the Elite Eight. Seed of the team they defeated is in parentheses, showing that three of these were upset victories (separated by more than 4 seed lines).

† Not an upset victory, as the 8 seed defeated a lower seed.
‡ Not officially an upset. as the teams were separated by fewer than 5 seed lines.

7 seeds 
Three 7 seeds have advanced to the Final Four. Seed of the team they defeated is in parentheses.

‡ Not officially an upset, as the teams were separated by fewer than 5 seed lines.

Final Four
The Final Four are the winners of the four Regional Finals.

8 seeds
Four of the six 8 seeds who advanced from the Elite Eight also won in the Final Four. Seeds of the teams they defeated are in parentheses, showing that three of these were upset victories (separated by more than 4 seed lines).

† Not an upset victory, as the 8 seed defeated a lower seed.

7 seeds
One of the three 7 seeds who advanced from the Elite Eight also won in the Final Four. Seed of the team they defeated is in parentheses, showing that this was an upset victory (separated by more than 4 seed lines).

6 seeds
Two 6 seeds have advanced to the national championship game. Seed of the Final Four team they defeated is in parentheses.

‡ Not officially an upset, as the teams were separated by fewer than 5 seed lines.

National championship

8 seeds 
Only one of the four 8 seeds who advanced from the Final Four won the national championship, the lowest seed ever to do so. Seed of the team they defeated is in parentheses, showing that this was an upset victory (separated by more than 4 seed lines).

7 seeds 
The only 7 seed to advance from the Final Four went on to win the national championship. Seed of the team they defeated is in parentheses.

† Not an upset victory, as the 7 seed defeated a lower seed.

6 seeds 
Both of the 6 seeds who advanced from the Final Four won the national championship. Seeds of the teams they defeated are in parentheses, showing that both were upset victories (separated by more than 4 seed lines).

Footnotes

References

See also  
 NCAA Division I women's basketball tournament upsets

Upsets
College men's basketball records and statistics in the United States
College basketball in the United States lists